Harrow International School Shanghai is a British international boarding and day, all-through school in Waigaoqiao, Pudong, Shanghai. It opened in August 2016 and is the fourth in the Harrow family of schools in the Asia region in association with Harrow School and The John Lyon School in London. The School provides a British independent style of education from early years to Y13.

Location 
Harrow has a campus with a designated 70% green space ratio, located within the Sunland project in the Waigaoqiao area of Pudong District in Shanghai.

The school

School structure 
The School is divided into five phases of progression as follows:

 The Early Years (K1 and K2) follows the English-based ‘Early Years Foundation Stage’ Curriculum.
 The Pre-Prep School (Y1 to Y4) follows the English-based ‘National Curriculum of England’.
 The Prep School (Y5 to Y8) is offered to help pupils manage the transition from the homeroom environment in the Pre-Prep School to the more subject-specific environment in the Senior School.
 The Senior School (Y9 to Y11) curriculum is based on IGCSE courses studied over two years (Y10 to Y11).
 The Sixth Form (Y12 to Y13) curriculum is based on A-level courses studied over two years.

Extra-curricular activities 
"As with the other Harrow International Schools, a very comprehensive extra-curricular programme, which is called Leadership in Action, being the practical application of the Harrow International’s vision statement, will involve all students and teachers every week. Leadership in Action includes community service, outdoor education, sport, the performing arts and a wide range of clubs and hobbies."

The campus 
The facilities include:
 Two-storey library
 12 science laboratories
  swimming pool
 Double-sized sports hall
 Roof-top running track
 Football and rugby pitch
 Rooftop gardens
 Computing suites
 Art and design studios
 Modern music and drama complex
 Medical centre
 A comprehensive and fully integrated air filtration system

See also
 Harrow International School Bangkok
 Harrow International School Beijing
 Harrow International School Hong Kong

References

External links 
 

High schools in Shanghai
Educational institutions established in 2016
British international schools in Shanghai
Pudong
2016 establishments in China